Galaxy Air was an airline based in Kyrgyzstan.

The airline was on the list of air carriers banned in the European Union.

Destinations
As of May 2007, Galaxy Air operated scheduled cargo flights to the following destinations:

India
Delhi
Kyrgyzstan
Bishkek, hub
United Arab Emirates
Dubai

Due to the European Union placing all 27 airlines registered in Kyrgyzstan on the banned airline list on 12 October 2006, and those airlines still appearing on the list as of 5 March 2007, the airline has been forced to scale back its schedule.

Fleet
As of May 2007, the Galaxy Air fleet included the following:

 1 Boeing 707-320C

References

External links
 Galaxy Air official website

Defunct airlines of Kyrgyzstan
Airlines established in 2006
Airlines disestablished in 2010
2006 establishments in Kyrgyzstan